Guglielmo Capodoro (1670 in Modena – ?) was an Italian painter of the Baroque period. He trained under Antonio Calza and mainly painted battle paintings in the style of Jacques Courtois

References

1670 births
17th-century Italian painters
Painters from Modena
Italian Baroque painters
Italian battle painters
Year of death unknown